Perdita Rose Weeks (born 25 December 1985) is a British actress who plays Juliet Higgins in the CBS/NBC reboot series Magnum P.I.

Life and education
Weeks was born in South Glamorgan, to Robin and Susan (née Wade) Weeks, was educated at Roedean School in East Sussex, and studied art history at the Courtauld Institute in London. She is the younger sister of Honeysuckle Weeks and the older sister of Rollo Weeks, both actors.

Acting career
Weeks portrayed Mary Boleyn in the Showtime historical drama The Tudors (2007–08). In 2008 she appeared as Lydia Bennet in the ITV series Lost in Austen. She played a murdering teen in the "Death and Dreams" episode of Midsomer Murders in 2003.

Weeks has worked on productions such as Stig of the Dump (2002), Sherlock Holmes and the Case of the Silk Stocking (2004), and Miss Potter (2006) and played the role of Kitten in the episode "Counter Culture Blues" of Lewis in 2009. In 2007 she appeared in the radio comedy Bleak Expectations, and in 2011 Weeks appeared in the TV miniseries The Promise.

Weeks co-starred, in an uncredited role, with her sister Honeysuckle in Episode 3 of Goggle Eyes (1993), and in Catherine Cookson's The Rag Nymph (1997): in the latter production she played the younger version of her sister's character. She also stars in the 2010 horror film Prowl, and the 2014 found footage horror film As Above, So Below.

In 2018, Weeks began starring as Juliet Higgins in the CBS reboot of Magnum P.I., filming in Hawaii. After four seasons, the series was picked up by NBC in 2022, with Weeks confirmed to continue in the role.

Filmography

References

External links
 
 Perdita Weeks - Instagram Account

1985 births
Living people
Alumni of the Courtauld Institute of Art
British film actresses
British radio actresses
British television actresses
People educated at Roedean School, East Sussex
Actresses from Cardiff
British child actresses
20th-century British actresses
21st-century British actresses
British voice actresses
British video game actresses